Ruth LeCocq Kagi (born August 14, 1945) is an American politician from Washington. Kagi is a former Democratic member of the Washington House of Representatives, representing the 32nd district.

She did not seek re-election in 2018, and was succeeded by Lauren Davis.

Personal life 
Kagi's husband is Mark. Kagi has two children and three step-children. Kagi and her family live in Shoreline, Washington.

References

External links 
 Ruth Kagi at ballotpedia.org

1945 births
Living people
Democratic Party members of the Washington House of Representatives
Women state legislators in Washington (state)
21st-century American politicians
21st-century American women politicians